Tillinghast is a surname. Notable people with the surname include:

A. W. Tillinghast (1874–1942), United States golf course architect
Charles Carpenter Tillinghast, Jr. (1911–1998), American chairman of Trans World Airlines and chancellor of Brown University
John Tillinghast (1604–1655), British clergyman
Mary Tillinghast (f. 1690s), British food writer
Mary Elizabeth Tillinghast (1845-1912), American stained-glass artist
Muriel Tillinghast, American civil rights activist
Pardon Tillinghast (1622–1717), early American Baptist pastor and public official
Richard Tillinghast (born 1940), United States poet
Wallace Tillinghast (f. 1909–1910), United States man who falsely claimed to have invented a flying machine

It may also refer to a prominent Rhode Island political family, whose members include:

Joseph L. Tillinghast (1791–1844), United States political figure from Rhode Island
Charles Foster Tillinghast (1797–1864), American lawyer, founder of the Tillinghast Licht law firm, and grandfather of Charles Foster Tillinghast Sr.
Thomas Tillinghast (1842–1921), United States political figure from Rhode Island
Charles Foster Tillinghast Sr. (1871-1948), American businessman and National Guard officer 
Charles Foster Tillinghast Jr. (1913-1995), American yachtsman and naval officer, son of Charles Foster Tillinghast Sr.

See also
Justice Tillinghast (disambiguation)